Kadızadelis (also Qādīzādali) were  a seventeenth-century puritanical reformist religious movement in the Ottoman Empire who followed Kadızade Mehmed (1582-1635), a revivalist Islamic preacher. Kadızade and  his followers were determined rivals of Sufism and popular religion. They condemned many of the Ottoman practices that Kadızade felt were bidʻah "non-Islamic innovations", and passionately supported "reviving  the beliefs and  practices  of  the  first  Muslim  generation  in  the  first/seventh  century" ("enjoining good and forbidding wrong").  

Driven by zealous and fiery rhetoric, Kadızade Mehmed was able to inspire many followers to join in his cause and rid themselves of any and all corruption found inside of the Ottoman Empire. Leaders of the movement held official positions as preachers in the major mosques of Baghdad, and "combined popular followings with support from within the Ottoman state apparatus". Between 1630 and 1680 there were many violent quarrels that occurred between the Kadızadelis and those that they disapproved of.  As the movement progressed, activists became "increasingly violent" and Kadızadelis were known to enter "mosques, tekkes and Ottoman coffeehouses in order to mete out punishments to those contravening their version of orthodoxy."

Origin

Kadızade Mehmed 

In 1582, Kadızade was born to the son of a provincial judge in the western Anatolian town of Balıkesir. In his hometown, Kadızade studied the learned disciplines of the distinguished fundamentalist theologian Muhammad Birgivi (died 1573), who has been called "the inspiration of the Qādīzādeli movement"; he then in due course prepared his way to the imperial capital Istanbul. It is in Istanbul where he engaged in a career as a mosque preacher, through "the path of sermon and admonition," conversely he eventually neglected the prudish teachings of his Balıkesir guides. It became apparent that Kadızadeler and Sufis were unable to get along because Birgili Mehmed himself had tried to seek a relationship with a Sufi order in his formative years. "As with Birgili, despite an initial affinity, Kadızade’s temperament and his religious predilections were determined to be unsuited to Sufism".

He soon enduringly returned to his former career as a preacher by implementing a more strict approach to "sermon and admonition" together. Kadızade gradually became the most active antagonist of Sufism. He continued to be a religious instructor for many years at the Murat Pasha Mosque, Aksaray, Istanbul, where he was also appointed as a Friday preacher at the Yavuz Selim Mosque "in recognition of his gifts of expression and grace of delivery." This promotion had established Kadızade's career determinedly. In addition to Kadızade's appointment with Sultan Selim, he was granted admittance to the ranks of the imperial mosques. In Istanbul during the seventeenth century, found that leadership after Kadızade Mehmed's legacy was in a minor grouping of one mind mosque preachers.

Kadizadeli 
The Kadizadeli movement erupted in response to the challenge that the Sufis and their ulema supports had come to be known as the standard for mosque preachers. The Kadızadeli vaizan or preachers, were not men from the ulema ranking hierarchy. They were mosque preachers that corresponded to an assortment of less significant religious career pursuits. The Kadızadeli vaizan were extremely popular amongst the populace and persuasive preachers because they tended to remark on the modern-day scene, often involving distinct individuals into account.

In the words of Madeline C. Zilfi, 
The Kadizadeli offensive against innovation (bida), and against popular religion generally, was an outgrowth of the uncompromising hostility of Istanbul's premier Friday mosque preachers, led by Kadızade Mehmed b. Mustafa, toward certain of the empire's major Sufi orders, symbolized in Kadızade's day by the Halveti shaikh Ebulhayr Mecdeddin Abulmedid, known as Sivasi Efendi (d. 1639). The debate that Kadızade and Sivasi stirred in Istanbul during their lifetimes continued to spill over to other Ottoman cities and to subsequent generations long after the original antagonists were dead.

Kadizade Ideology 
Kadizade in his sermons "used the grand pupil of Aya Sofya to propagate a kind of "fundamentalist" ethic, a set of doctrinal positions intended to rid Islam of beliefs and practices that had accumulated since the era of the Prophet Muhammad’s Medina." Kadizade's sermons and his persuasive style of delivery permeated "new life into the centuries-old dialect between innovation and fundamental, "orthodox," Islam". For Kadızade and his followers, innovation represented for their spiritual guides and the Islamic past, a shift away from the vulnerable salvation of the society. The Kadızade's contended that Muslims had abandoned the Sunna, the "way" of the Prophet Muhammad due to the prominence of the Sufi order. Accordingly, the Kadızadelis maintain that if the Sufi is not restrained, then the whole society would be forged into non-belief.

In addition, the Kadızadelis specified precise Koran sanctions against wine and had sermons paying attention to a variety of controversies that had progressed during the Prophet Muhammad era. The Kadizadelis took the negative pose and argued that the "issues typified the contagion of Sufi-inspired error." 
Moreover, with respect to religious obligations, the Kadızadelis asserted that every single believer was obligated to comply with the Koran's law sanctioning to "enjoin right and prohibit wrong." Besides, the Kadizadelis contended that those who rejected to abandon such innovations were "heretics who must reaffirm their faith or be punished." According to the Sufi spokesmen, and others opposed to the Kadızadeli movement, contends that “Kadizadeli-labeled "innovation" was either not canonically forbidden or had flourished for centuries within the community and thus stood validated by the principle of consensus.”

According to Mustapha Sheikh, under "the leadership of Uṣṭūwanī", attacks on un-Islamic behaviour were not left to the authorities. One preacher (Al-Aqḥiṣāri) urging his followers to physically remove from the pulpit any preacher "whose sermon is not in conformity with the Quran and Sunna". As the movement progressed, activists became "increasingly violent" and Qadizadelis were known to enter "mosques, tekkes and coffeehouses in order to mete out punishments to those contravening their version of orthodoxy."

Kadızadeli Criticisms 
The Kadızadelis protested against Ottoman expenditures, especially military expenditures, which they felt were financially and morally bankrupted the society itself. The Kadızadelis argued that substances such as "coffee, tobacco, opium, and other drugs" must be denounced. Moreover, practices such as "singing, chanting, musical accompaniment, dancing, whirling, and similar rhythmic movement in Sufi ceremonies for the "recollection" of God must also be banned. In addition, "other damning usages, according to Kadizadelis, included pilgrimages to the tombs of alleged saints; invocations of blessings upon the Prophet and his Companions upon each mention of their names; collective supererogatory prayers and rituals of post-patriarchal origins; vilification of the Umayyad Caliph Yazid; the use of bribery among officeholders; and grasping hands and bowing down before social superiors" According to Kadızadelis, those who rejected to abandon such innovations were "heretics who must reaffirm their faith or be punished".

The Kadizadelis promoted their ideals in the mosques "for public support of an activist, interventionist, 'enjoining of right and wrong', and demanded of their congregations not only that they purify their own lives, but that they seek out sinners and in effect force them back onto the straight path". The Kadızadelis also voiced their opinions in Friday sermons, learned treaties, and public confrontations, hammering away at the Sufi movement. Palace scandals were also another issue the Kadızadelis felt strongly about and felt that it weakened the image of Islam to "others". The Kadızadelis believed that Sufis were an aberration of Islam and thus had no place in Ottoman society. However, "the Sufi side was defended by dignitaries who were not Sufi at all. The Kadızadelis, meanwhile, were directed by a leadership so narrow that it seldom represented the official guardians of Sharia orthodoxy, the principal ulema of the realm".

Promotion and Dissolution 
In 1631, Kadızade served as a Friday preacher at Beyazid for eight years and at Suleymaniye for one or two months, he was then promoted to Aya Sofya, the imperial mosque. "It was clear that for a growing segment of the mosque-going public, Kadizade had become the instrument of their escape from the hellish depths of ignorance". Kadizade's speech-making had permeated "new life into the centuries old dialectic between innovation and fundamental 'orthodox' Islam" yet his "underlying struggle laid between Kadizadeli Puritanism and the pragmatism of ulema decision-makers" and this was something Kadizade fought hard to bridge the gap between. At first, in order to quell resentment and rebellion, as well as to settle down the Kadizadelis, Murad IV worked with Kadizade Mehmed and suppressed the most blatant displays of luxury and aberrant behaviour. This however this did not prevent the Kadizadelis agitation toward the Ottoman Empire and "in 1656, after the appointment of Koprulu Mehmed to the Grand Vezirate, the Kadizadeli wave ended". However, Mehmed was not excessively "fond of the Sufis and their practices; he felt Kadizadeli vigilantism was more threatening to his vision of order" "It came at a crucial time as well since an armed Kadizadeli movement had made their way towards the Fatih mosque. Koprulu Mehmed acted swiftly, arresting then banishing off key members to Cyprus". This was a devastating loss to the Kadizadelis who lost their public voice and at that moment, seemed to have been slowly disappearing into the abyss of obscurity.

Kadizade Reappearance 
However, soon afterwards, the Kadizadelis regained a voice in the form of Bistam Vani (i.e. from Van). This time around though, the Kadizadeli movement had not as much steam as in the past. After successful defeats to Vienna, Vani was removed from his posts and banished until he died in 1685.

Conclusion 
The Kadizadelis failed in implementing their endeavors; nevertheless their campaign emphasized the divisions within the religious establishment in Ottoman society. The Kadizadeli legacy from one generation to another has been deeply enmeshed in the leaders who were inspired by scholar Birgivi that gave growth to the Kadizade movement. The Kadizade's religious advancement in the Ottoman periphery strengthened the anti-elitist movement. In the end, the faith's chief ulema's continued to support Sufi theology. Many academics and scholars have argued that the Kadizadelis were self-serving and hypocritical; since most of their criticisms were based around the fact that they were on the fringes of society and felt alienated from the rest of the social order. Scholars felt due to being separated from opportunities and power positions inside of the Ottoman Empire, the Kadizadelis took the position they did and were thus cast as reformers instead instigators.

References

Further reading 
 Goffman, D. The Ottoman Empire and Early Modern Europe. Cambridge, 2002
 Zilfi, Madeline C. The Politics of Piety: The Ottoman Ulema in the Post-Classical Age (1600-1800). 1995.

External links
 Ottoman History -- 17th Century Ideas and Society 
 Ottoman Terms
 

17th century in the Ottoman Empire
Islam in the Ottoman Empire